The list of ship launches in 1961 includes a chronological list of all ships launched in 1961.


References

Sources

1961
Ship launches